Edward Northey (1755 – 18 February 1828) was a Canon of Windsor from 1797 to 1828.

Career

He was educated at Corpus Christi College, Cambridge.

He was appointed:
Vicar of Kinlett, Shropshire
Vicar of Cleobury Mortimer, Shropshire
Vicar of Urchfont, Wiltshire, 1800
Vicar of Nether Stowey, Somerset 1801
Vicar of Edlesborough, Buckinghamshire 1807–1841
Rector of West Ilsley, Berkshire 1820–1826

He was appointed to the seventh stall in St George's Chapel, Windsor Castle in 1797, and held the stall until 1828. He was buried in the chapel on 27 February 1828.

Notes 

1755 births
1828 deaths
Canons of Windsor
Alumni of Corpus Christi College, Cambridge